Quantum fingerprinting is a proposed technique that uses a quantum computer to generate a string with a similar function to the cryptographic hash function. To do this,  quantum states are produced from the O(logn)-qubit state fingerprints and sent to the referee who performs the Swap test to detect if the fingerprints are similar or different with a high probability.

If unconditional guarantees of security are needed, and if it is impractical for the communicating parties to arrange to share a secret that can be used in a Carter–Wegman MAC, this technique might one day be faster than classical techniques given a quantum computer with 5 to 10 qubits.  However, these circumstances are very unusual and it is unlikely the technique will ever have a practical application; it is largely of theoretical interest.

References

See also 

 Quantum cryptography
 Quantum digital signature
 Swap test

Cryptographic hash functions
Quantum information science